National Policy Dialogues on Integrated Water Resources Management in Azerbaijan for managing water resources are aimed at developing a state strategy based on "Convention on the Protection and Use of Transboundary Watercourses and International Lakes" of United Nations Economic Commission for Europe and European Union Water Framework Directive and the "Water and Health" Protocol of that convention as well as other principles of the United Nations and the EU.

Documents, directives and other acts of the EU, the United Nations Economic Commission for Europe, the United Nations Environment Programme, the Global Water Partnership, as well as other international organizations were used in the preparation of strategy. It was taken into account most international water legislation requirements.

History 
In the late 80's and early  there was a serious problem in the water supply system in Azerbaijan. After the gaining of independence, the main task of government was to eliminate the difficulties in the water supply system as well as in many areas of the economy. First of all, the establishment of an organization that could improve the drinking water supply of residential settlements in Baku, Sumgayit and Absheron peninsula began. So, the Absheron Regional Joint Stock Water Company was created in 1995, under the decision of the National Assembly of Azerbaijan based on the main and circulating assets of the two former state-owned enterprises - "Kommunsenayesutehjizaty" Production Association and "AzSuGEO" Scientific-Research Institute.

At that period of time, for the first time among the CIS, a loan was granted to the water sector by international financial institutions for the "Greater Baku Water Supply Rehabilitation Project"  and this project was successfully implemented.

Drinking water supply 

In 2004, the repartition of water resources in Azerbaijan is as follow: 30% rivers, 40% lakes, 20% reservoirs and the rest between springs and groundwater. According to the Food and Agriculture Organization of the United Nations (FAO), in 2008 7% of the consumed water in Azerbaidjan was coming from underground sources.

Mingachevir reservoir of the Kura river is used as a source of drinking water by the population.

Reservoirs

Mingachevir reservoir 
This Mingachevir water reservoir was created on the Kura river. The construction of the Mingachevir reservoir and the Hydroelectric Power Station was completed in 1953. The total capacity of the reservoir at the normal level (83 m) is 15730 mln m3, useful volume of it is 8210 mln m3. The area of the reservoir is 605 km2, the volume is 16.1 km3, the length is 70 km, the maximum width is 18 km, the average depth is 26 m, the deepest is 75 m.

Jeyranbatan reservoir 
Jeyranbatan water reservoir was established in 1955 due to increasing demand for drinking and technical water in Baku and Sumgayit. The capacity of the reservoir is 186 million m3, the useful volume is 150 mln m3. The length of the reservoir is 8.74 km, the maximum width is 2.15 km, the length of the coastline is 23.3 km, the maximum depth is 28.5 meters.

Sanitation 
In the sewerage sector, Baku wastewater network serves 72% population of the city, but only 50% of the water is treated. 90% of the treated water is biologically processed and only 10% is mechanically processed. Wastewater treatment plants are available in 16 cities and regions; most of them are partially or completely useless. In most cases, the quality of water supplied to the population does not meet the required standards. The state works with donor communities to take the necessary measures to address these problems. The Azerbaijani government has adopted a program on the construction of water supply and sewage systems in more than 60 small towns (regional centers) in the country.  The state has already started to implement more than 20 such projects.  At the same time, local water supply projects are being implemented.

"Small Towns Water Supply and Sanitation Sector Project" 
The Loan agreement between the Government of Azerbaijan and the Japan International Cooperation Agency on the "Small Towns Water Supply and Sanitation Sector Project " was signed on 29 May 2009 and entered into force on 30 June 2009. The project covers rehabilitation of water supply and sanitation systems in Gusar, Khachmaz, Khizi, Gobustan and Naftalan.

Gusar City 
"The project on rehabilitation of water supply and sanitation system of Gusar town" has been calculated to improve drinking water and sanitation services of 19,600 people in Gusar city, taking into account perspective development until 2030. Within the project, drinking water supply will be improved in 12,000 people living in Balakusar, Hasanqala, Old Khudat, Chilagir, Yukhari Layar, Gayakend, Khuray villages of Gusar region and Chartepe, Orta Khuch, Ashagi Khuch villages of Guba region.

Construction and installation works on the project started on April 19, 2012. At the first stage of the project, a drainage water facility with a capacity of 102 liters per day or 8800 cubic meters per day was constructed in Gusarchay river to provide Gusar and its surrounding villages with drinking water. At the same time, three water reservoirs with a total capacity of 1,000 cubic meters, a 2.8 km long inter-reservoir water line and a new water chlorinating building were constructed.

Khachmaz City 
Implementation of the project on rehabilitation of drinking water supply and sanitation systems of Khachmaz city started on 19 April 2012. The project has been calculated to improve drinking water and sanitation services of 47,000 people in Khachmaz, the water supply of 11,000 people in Qobuqyagi, Armudpadar, Garaychi, Garagurdlu and Old Khachmaz villages of the region.

In the first stage of the project, the Uchkun spring, (which is the main water source of the city) was rehabilitated, 2 km long trunk water line (400 mm) was constructed, 2 reservoirs with a total capacity of 10,000 cubic meters were built and 1,6 km water line between this reservoirs was constructed.

Khizi City 
Construction and installation works on the project started in 2012 and at the first stage of project, water intake facilities were built in Gars (430 cubic meters / day) and Yeddibulag (40 cubic meters / day) resources, and an 8.4 km long trunk water line was constructed in Khizi.

Naftalan city 
Implementation of the project for reconstruction of drinking water supply and sewerage system of Naftalan city started in early 2013.

Gobustan City 
A groundbreaking ceremony for reconstruction of Gobustan drinking water supply and sanitation system was held on May 10, 2015.

Water use
According to FAO's report, the major part of the water in Azerbaijan is used for agriculture and livestock (77%), the rest is shared between industry (19%) and municipalities (4%) as of 2005.

"Second National Water Supply and Sanitation Services" project 
Financing agreement on the project "Second National Water Supply and Sanitation Services" have been signed between Azerbaijan and World Bank on September 5, 2008.

Within the project, reconstruction of water supply and sanitation systems and facilities in 21 regions of the country (Devechi, Dashkasan, Gadabay, Imishli, Kurdamir, Siyazan, Agsu, Ismayilli, Ujar, Zardab, Lankaran, Masalli, Astara, Jalilabad, Yardimli, Lerik and also in 5 districts of Nakhchivan Autonomous Republic - Julfa, Ordubad, Sadarak, Kangarli, Shahbuz) was planned.

The total cost of the project is $410.0 million. $260.0 million of this amount was financed by loans from the International Bank for Reconstruction and Development (IBRD) and the International Development Association, and US$150.0 million was funded by the Government of Azerbaijan.

See also 

 Utilities in Azerbaijan
 Jeyranbatan Ultrafiltration Water Treatment Plants Complex
 Jeyranbatan reservoir
Azersu Open Joint Stock Company

References

External links

 Groundwater of Azerbaidjan, Prof.Dr. Adishirin B.Alakbarov

Economy of Azerbaijan
Bodies of water of Azerbaijan